Charles Sanguin, marquis de Livry (Paris 1802 - Enghien 14 October 1867) was a 19th-century French playwright.

After he made a career in the military, he became famous in the theatre. His plays, often signed Charles, were presented on the most important Parisian stages of his time including the Théâtre des Variétés, the Théâtre du Palais-Royal, the Théâtre de la Porte-Saint-Martin, and the Théâtre de la Gaité.

Works 

1828: Le Château de Monsieur le baron, comédie en vaudevilles in 2 acts, with Achille d'Artois and de Leuven
1828: Le Coup de pistolet, comédie en vaudevilles in 1 act, with Adolphe d'Houdetot
1828: L'École de natation, tableau-vaudeville in 1 act, with de Leuven and Alphonse Signol
1829: L'Audience du juge de paix, ou le Bureau de conciliation, tableau in 1 act, with Edmond Rochefort
1829: La Barrière du combat, ou le Théâtre des animaux, 2 tableaux mingled with animals and couplets, with Adolphe de Leuven and Julien de Mallian
1829: Le Tir au pistolet, vaudeville in 1 act, in 2 tableaux, with de Leuven and Masson
1829: La Tyrolienne, comédie en vaudevilles in 1 act, with de Leuven and Emmanuel Théaulon
1830: Madame Grégoire, ou le Cabaret de la pomme de pin, song in 2 acts, with Rochefortand Charles Dupeuty
1830: Un tour en Europe, nightmare in 5 fits, with prologue and epilogue, with Ferdinand Langlé and de Leuven
1831: Les Bouillons à domicile, revue-vaudeville in 1 act, with Gabriel de Lurieu and de Villeneuve
1831: La Caricature, ou les Croquis à la mode, album in 7 pochades, with de Lurieu and de Villeneuve
1831: Rabelais, ou le Presbytère de Meudon, comédie-anecdote mingled with couplets, with de Leuven
1831 Scaramouche, ou la Pièce interrompue, anecdote of 1669, in 2 acts, mingled with couplets, with Forges
1832: Le Bateau de blanchisseuses, tableau-vaudeville in 1 act
1832: Mon oncle Thomas, play in 5 acts and 6 tableaux, mingled with couplets, with Michel Masson
1833: La Révolte des femmes, vaudeville in 2 acts, with de Villeneuve
1833: Santeul ou Le chanoine au cabaret
1833: La Fille de Dominique, comédie en vaudevilles in 1 act, with de Villeneuve
1833: Les Locataires et les portiers, vaudeville in 1 act, with Brazier and de Villeneuve
1834: La Salamandre, comédie en vaudevilles in 4 acts, with de Leuven and Philippe-Auguste-Alfred Pittaud de Forges
1834: Un bal de domestiques, vaudeville in 1 act, with Ferdinand de Villeneuve
1834: Lionel, ou Mon avenir, comédie en vaudevilles in 2 acts, with de Villeneuve
1834: La Tempête, ou l'Île des bossus, folie-vaudeville in 1 act, with Forges and de Leuven
1835: Les Infidélités de Lisette, drama vaudeville in 5 acts, with Nicolas Brazier and de Villeneuve
1836: La Grue, fabliau mêlé de chant, with de Villeneuve
1836: Roquelaure, ou l'Homme le plus laid de France, vaudeville in 4 acts, with Léon Lévy Brunswick and de Leuven
1836: Madame Peterhoff, vaudeville anecdote in 1 act, with Antonin d'Avrecourt and Eugène Roche
1837: Mémoire d'une blanchisseuse, comedy in 1 act, mingled with couplets, with Brazier
1838: Mademoiselle Dangeville, comedy in 1 act, with de Villeneuve
1841: Voltaire en vacances, comédie en vaudevilles in 2 acts, with de Villeneuve
1847: Une vie de polichinelle, pantomime-arlequinade-féerie in 11 tableaux
1849: Les Épreuves, grande pantomime-arlequinade in 13 tableaux
1849: Les Naufrageurs de la Bretagne, dramatico-comic play, extravaganza mingled with pantomime, de combats au sabre, à la hache et au poignard, in 13 tableaux
1851: L'Audience du Prince, comédie en vaudevilles in 1 act, with Auguste Anicet-Bourgeois
1855: Trois têtes dans un bonnet, vaudeville in 1 act

Bibliography 
 Pierre Larousse, Grand Dictionnaire universel du XIXe, 1873
 Camille Dreyfus, André Berthelot, Livry, Charles marquis de, in La Grande encyclopédie : inventaire raisonné des sciences, des lettres et des arts, vol. 22, 1886, 
 Alfred Mézières, Encyclopédie universelle du XXe, vol. 8, 1908, 
 Bulletin de la Société de l'histoire du théâtre, vol. 2, 1908,  

19th-century French dramatists and playwrights
Writers from Paris
1802 births
1867 deaths